James Dillon (died 5 November 1955) was an Irish politician and farmer who served for thirteen years in the Seanad of the Irish Free State.

He was elected for twelve years at the 1925 Seanad election representing the Farmers' Party, and remained a senator until the Free State Seanad was abolished in 1936.

References

Year of birth missing
1955 deaths
Members of the 1925 Seanad
Members of the 1928 Seanad
Members of the 1931 Seanad
Members of the 1934 Seanad
Cumann na nGaedheal senators
Farmers' Party (Ireland) senators
Fine Gael senators
Irish farmers